The men's 12.5 km pursuit competition of the Pyeongchang 2018 Olympics was held on 12 February 2018 at the Alpensia Biathlon Centre in Pyeongchang, South Korea. The field was the same as for the sprint event, held on the previous day, with competitors starting time dependent on their final time in the sprint event.

Summary
The sprint champion, Arnd Peiffer, started on the first place. The starting intervals were very short, with number 10 starting merely half a minute behind Peiffer.

In the victory ceremony the day after, the medals were presented by Denis Oswald, member of the International Olympic Committee Executive Board, accompanied by Thomas Pfueller, IBU Vice President of Marketing.

Schedule
All times are (UTC+9).

Results
The race was started at 21:00.

References

Pursuit